The Pakpak Dairi Christian Protestant Church (GKPPD - Gereja Kristen Protestan Pakpak Dairi) is a Lutheran denomination in Indonesia. It is a member of the Lutheran World Federation, which it joined in 2000. It is affiliated with the Communion of Churches in Indonesia. Its president is Bishop Abednego Padang Batanghari (Ephorus).

References

External links 
Lutheran World Federation listing

Lutheran denominations
Lutheran organizations
Indonesia
Lutheran World Federation members